Emu Heights may refer to:

 Emu Heights, New South Wales. a locality in New South Wales, Australia
 Emu Heights, Tasmania, a locality in Tasmania, Australia